Rachel Fannan (born March 20, 1986) is an American singer, songwriter, musician and poet from Los Angeles, California. She made her musical debut in 2008, with the release of a solo album entitled Deeper Lurking, under the moniker Birds Fled from Me. She is best known as the lead vocalist of the band Only You, and formerly as co-lead vocalist of San Francisco psych-rockers Sleepy Sun, as well as for collaborations with UNKLE and progressive rock band Anywhere. She is currently singing with the Canadian rock band, Black Mountain, and drumming for the Russian feminist protest punk rock group Pussy Riot.

As a solo artist, Fannan has shared the stage with other prominent musicians such as Hunter Burgan (AFI), Carla Azar (Autolux), Rich Good (Psychedelic Furs), and Dash Hutton (Haim and Mini Mansions).

Early life 
Fannan was born in Thousand Oaks, California. She is the eldest daughter of composer and pianist Michael Glenn Williams and Marlene Marie Longamore. She has a younger brother, Michael Gaelen Williams, and a younger sister, Caitlin Elizabeth Williams.

Fannan spent much of her childhood encouraged to sing and perform; she later recalled acquiring a key to her school's choir room, where she would often eat her lunch and play the piano. She attended Ascension Lutheran, a private preparatory school in Thousand Oaks, and Banyan Elementary. She abstained from required performances throughout high school, devoting most of her time to extra curricular clubs and activities. She attended Santa Monica City College for six months, before dropping out to move to Santa Cruz, California.

Birds Fled from Me 
Between 2005 and 2008, Fannan wrote and recorded solo material under the moniker Birds Fled from Me. With producer/engineer Maxwell Lewis Golding, she released a lo-fi album entitled Deeper Lurking in 2008.

Sleepy Sun 
In 2007, while performing in Santa Cruz, California, Fannan was invited to sit in with psych rockers Sleepy Sun, and was quickly recruited to be their co-lead vocalist. Her vocals are featured on the band's first two albums Embrace (ATP Recordings, 2009) and Fever (ATP Recordings, 2010); both albums, recorded with producer Colin Stewart at the Hive in Vancouver, B.C., do not physically credit Fannan. Fannan left the band due to mental health reasons in late October 2010.

Collaborations 
During and soon after leaving Sleepy Sun, Fannan recorded with British trip-hop duo UNKLE. Her first collaboration "Follow Me Down" is credited as a Sleepy Sun feature, but primarily features Fannan, her lyrics, and melody. "Sunday Song", also featuring Fannan, was released as part of their Only the Lonely EP, and Where Did the Night Fall – Another Night Out album.

Following a short stint supporting Dinosaur Jr. frontman J Mascis, Fannan was approached by Christian Eric Beaulieu (Triclops!) to collaborate on the musical project Anywhere, which also included Mike Watt (Minutemen, The Stooges) and Cedric Bixler-Zavala (The Mars Volta, At the Drive-In). Fannan sang lead vocals on their debut single "Dead Golden West" (Valley King Records, November 2011) and on the song "Rosa Rugosa" on their self-titled debut Anywhere (ATP Recordings, 2012).

In late 2012, she toured as keyboard player and backing vocalist for The Fresh & Onlys.

Only You 
Created in late 2010, Only You is Fannan's L.A. based retro rock band, whose lineup has included a rotating cast of backing musicians.

In early 2012, the band began performing as an all-female group, with Fannan being joined by bassist Micayla Grace (Bleached, Leopold and His Fiction), guitarist Cecilia Peruti (Gothic Tropic), and drummer Lia Braswell (Le Butcherettes).
Only You released their first single "Applying Myself" through White Iris Records in October 2012. The b-side "Love Is Making Me Tired" was featured as a Daily Download on Rolling Stone'''s website. In 2015 Fannan later released another single through a different label Hit City U.S.A as Only You, "Let Me Burn", the B-side to this was "The Pressure".

As of 2013, the Only You lineup features Fannan, backed by an all-male band, including lead guitarist Brandon Intelligator (Slang Chickens), Jeff Lynne (Wires on Fire) and Patrick Taylor (Ceremonies).

Other musicians that have previously played with the group include Amy Aileen Wood, Jon Sortland (Cigar, Broken Bells), Rich Good (Kings & Queens, Psychedelic Furs), Evan Weiss (Slang Chickens, Wires on Fire), Dash Hutton (Slang Chickens, Wires on Fire, Papa).

Other work
In 2012, a version of Stephen Foster's classic parlor song "Beautiful Dreamer", featuring Fannan on vocals, was used in a commercial by Canon, which went on to win the award for Outstanding Commercial at the 2012–2013 Creative Arts Primetime Emmys.

In 2016, she released an EP, Everybody's Famous, as The Bomb.

In 2017, she published her first book of original poetry, No One Wants to Give Up.

In 2018, she was a featured vocalist on Devil May Cry 5'''s "Crimson Cloud", with composer Jeff Rona.

References

1986 births
Living people
American multi-instrumentalists
American women singer-songwriters
21st-century American women